The Microenterprise Education Initiative (MEI), headed by Dr. Jeremi Brewer, is an initiative that was announced for adoption by the Ballard Center for Economic Self-Reliance, Marriott School of Management, Brigham Young University (BYU) in December 2011. MEI was created with the purpose of becoming an international thought leader in educating NGOs about micro-enterprise education.

History 

Born in Bremerton, Washington, Gibson has extensive experience with business. He has started more than a dozen companies and taught entrepreneurship at both BYU–Hawaii and BYU Provo in the Marriott School of Management. One of his most well known philanthropic ventures is his creation of the Academy for Creating Enterprise, also known as the Academy.

Gibson and his wife started the Academy for Creating Enterprise in 1999. He relates that while traveling in the Philippines, he was shocked to see many returned missionaries from his church, The Church of Jesus Christ of Latter-day Saints, living below the poverty level. The Academy was an effort to give these returned missionaries a future. 

Jeremi Brewer received his PhD from Texas A&M University. His doctoral research  on "Culture, Poverty, and Necessity Entrepreneurship." Brewer conducted the majority of his research in Mexico and Brazil. He is a Peery Fellow at the Ballard Center for Economic Self-Reliance. In December 2011, Brewer was voted to be the Executive Director of the Academy for Creating Enterprise and will begin his tenure there on August 1, 2012.

Purpose 

The mission of MEI is to become the international thought leader in educating micro-enterprise- focused NGOs globally. The basic means for accomplishing this include the preparation and utilization of an action lab which will facilitate the discussion of best practices and also challenges that are commonly faced. The findings to these issues will then be used to become the foundational research in creating a microenterprise toolkit.

With the research concerning best practices, input from knowledgeable NGO directors, and a collaborative action lab to be held in March, MEI is planning on creating an action toolkit that will aid in NGOs training microenterprise operators worldwide.

Microenterprises are defined as small businesses with five or fewer employees. They are prevalent throughout the developing world as large companies that employ hundreds, like those seen in developed countries, are scarce. Forced out of necessity into starting a microenterprise, operators are often unskilled and barely living above poverty. Microenterprise education courses teach best practices and proven business skills, which help develop and improve business into successful ventures that provide significant income. As quoted by a student of the Academy:

“My dream is not to die in poverty, but to have poverty die in me.” (NIFTY)

Micro-enterprise Organizations  

Some organizations that work with Micro-enterprise organization include:

 ASCEND: A Humanitarian Alliance
 Care for Life
 Cause for Hope
 Choice Humanitarian
 Eagle Condor Humanitarian
 Mentors International
 Fundación Paraguaya
 Global Outreach Alliance
 HELP International
 Hope Arising
 Interweave Solutions
 Jembatan International
 No Poor Among Us
 Ouelessebougou-Utah Alliance
 Pearls With a Purpose
 Suazo Business Center
 Reach the Children
 Rising Star Outreach
 Sabuhelp
 SWAN (Serving Women Across Nations)
 Worldwide Organization for Women
 Yehu Microfinance

References 

Microfinance organizations